Ilisoni Logaivau Tuinawaivuvu (born 8 January 1991) is a Fijian football player. Currently a member of Labasa in the National Football League.

References

External links
 
 

1991 births
Living people
Fijian footballers
Fiji international footballers
Labasa F.C. players
2012 OFC Nations Cup players
2016 OFC Nations Cup players
Association football midfielders